John Perle may refer to:

John Perle (died 1402), MP for Dorchester and Dorset
John Perle (died 1429), MP for Shrewsbury